Angelo Marino (April 30, 1956 – October 10, 2018) was an Italian art dealer and curator. He was the first Italian gallery owner to turn his gallery,  dirartecontemporanea, into a virtual exhibition space (dirartecontemporanea 2.0).

Biography 
Angelo Marino was born in Frattaminore. In 1991 he founded the gallery dirartecontemporanea in Caserta. In 2001 he organized a group of seminars at the Belvedere San Leucio Caserta, Scavare il futuro: nuovi spazi antichi, in collaboration with Elmar Zorn and City of Caserta. In the same year he collaborated to the installation of the exhibition Plus Ultra at the Royal Palace of Caserta.

In 2003 he curated Un anfiteatro per la Pace: stendardi d'artista, an exhibition featuring the work of Carla Accardi, Arcangelo, Angelo Bellobono, Elisabetta Benassi, Dafni & Papadatos, Gianni Dessi, Francesco Impellizzeri, Jannis Kounellis, H.H. Lim, Mafonso, Luigi Mainolfi, Fabio Mauri, Sukran Moral, Hidetoshi Nagasawa, Luigi Ontani and Giacomo Zaza in Piazza Dante in Caserta. In 2005 he organised Il senso del male, an exhibition conceived as a reflection on the tense political climate following 9/11 questioning the meaning of evil at Chiostro di S. Agostino in Caserta. 

In 2012 Marino converted dirartecontemporanea into a virtual gallery where artists were invited to create works specifically in a web-related context. His idea was to propose a new way to experience contemporary art, without geographical and temporal boundaries. The first exhibition was Max Coppeta: visioni transitorie. Works 2001.2012. In 2013 the project was expanded to the Independent Web-Pavilion of the Indigenous Tribes of the Amazon Basin, a tribute to the tribes of native tribes from the Amazon forest still unaffected by Globalisation. This was followed by the 2nd Independent Web Pavilion: Humanity, Betrayed & Traitors.

In 2016 he created the D2.0-box, an exhibition space where a large screen would enable the audience to meet and discuss online exhibitions.

Marino was also a friend and mentor of many artists from the Campania region, including Antonio Biasiucci, Nino Longobardi, Mafonso, Piero Chiariello, Arturo Casanova, Luigi Auriemma, Bruno Fermariello, Gloria Pastore and Mariano Filippetta. In 2016 he celebrated this connection in the exhibition Friends

Marino died on October 10, 2018.

Exhibitions    
 Max Coppeta: visioni transitorie. Works 2001.2012
 Mariano Filippetta: Le mie voglie col blu
 Independent Web-Pavilion of the Indigenous Tribes of the Amazon Basin
 Mafonso: Di_segni. Works 2013
 Piero Chiariello: Natura Digitale
 Claudia Jares: My Long Play
 '2nd Independent Web Pavilion: Humanity – Betrayed & Traitors
 Mariano Filippetta: Il grande mare della notte
 Reperti
 Plus Ultra di Mafonso, fifteen years later
 Mario Velocci: Spazio.Linea.Suono curated bay Martina Velocci, 17 October 2017
 Trovamento: frammenti di artisti in mostra da D2.0-box.
 My Work Tells My Story: Chiara Coccorese May 2018
 My Work Tells My Story: Daniela Morante. Alfabeto Segnico 9 June 2018
 My Work Tells My Story: Gloria Pastore. L'Ermafrodita January 2018 23 June 2018
 My Work Tells My Story:  Maria Adele Del Vecchio. Mirrors, June 2018

Bibliography  
 Francesco Gallo (ed), Angelo Marino promoter Plus Ultra
 Lorenzo Canova (ed), Il senso del male, contemporary Art Museum, Caserta Collocazione MAC3 MISC A 6
 Angelo Marino (ed), 2nd Independent Web Pavilion: Humanity. Betrayed & Traitors
 Ileana Maria Zaza (ed), Claudia Jares: My Long Play
 Angelo Marino (ed), 3rd Independent Web Pavilion: Indigenous Tribes of the Amazon Basin
 Veronica D'Auria (ed), Piero Chiariello: Natura Digitale
 Vincenzo Trione (ed), Atlante dell’Arte Contemporanea a Napoli e in Campania 1966—2016. Text by Loredana Troise, Electa Mondadori, Milan, 2017.

References

External links 

 Dirartecontemporanea 2.0 virtual gallery
 http://www.madrenapoli.it/eventi/weekend-del-contemporaneo-8/

People from the Province of Naples
1956 births
2018 deaths
Italian art curators
Italian art dealers